Dessislava Svetoslavova Mladenova (Bulgarian: Десислава Светославова Младенова, born 21 June 1988) is a Bulgarian former professional tennis player.

On 6 October 2008, she reached her highest WTA singles ranking of No. 684, whilst her best doubles ranking was 388 on 5 May 2008. IN her career, she won three doubles titles on the ITF Circuit.

ITF Circuit finals

Singles: 1 (1 runner–up)

Doubles 10 (3 titles, 7 runner–ups)

Fed Cup
Dessislava Mladenova debuted for the Bulgaria Fed Cup team in 2007. Since then, she has a 1–2 doubles record (1–2 overall).

Doubles: 3 (1–2)

References

External links

 
 
 

1988 births
Living people
Sportspeople from Sofia
Bulgarian female tennis players